Silas Marner is a 1916 American silent drama film directed by Ernest C. Warde and starring Frederick Warde, Valda Valkyrien, and Morgan Jones. It is an adaptation of the 1861 novel Silas Marner by George Eliot.

Cast
 Frederick Warde as Silas Marner 
 Louise Bates as His sweetheart 
 Morgan Jones as His supposed friend 
 Thomas A. Curran as Godfrey 
 Valda Valkyrien as Molly 
 Ethel Jewett as Nancy 
 Frank McNish as The Squire Cass 
 Hector Dion as Dunstan 
 Arthur Rankin as Lammeter

References

Bibliography
 Goble, Alan. The Complete Index to Literary Sources in Film. Walter de Gruyter, 1999.

External links

1916 films
1916 drama films
Silent American drama films
Films directed by Ernest C. Warde
American silent feature films
1910s English-language films
American black-and-white films
Films set in England
Films based on British novels
Mutual Film films
1910s American films